Morbid love was a term used in psychiatric texts of the late nineteenth and early twentieth centuries. It referred to what was becoming more commonly described as sexual perversion or pathology. It was a term inspired by decadent French fiction, especially the poetry of Charles Baudelaire, and Rachilde.

References 

Love